Ivnitsy is a rural locality (a village) in Beryozovskoye Rural Settlement, Ramonsky District, Voronezh Oblast, Russia. The population was 115 as of 2010. There are 18 streets.

Geography 
Ivnitsy is located 8 km northeast of Ramon (the district's administrative centre) by road. Borki is the nearest rural locality.

References 

Rural localities in Ramonsky District